Dadu Kola (also Romanized as Dādū Kolā and Dādū Kalā; also known as  Dādū Kūlā and Dāvūd Kolā) is a village in Banaft Rural District, Dodangeh District, Sari County, Mazandaran Province, Iran. At the 2006 census, its population was 208, in 52 families.

References 

Populated places in Sari County